The Atlantic Coast Line Railroad Depot is a historic Atlantic Coast Line Railroad depot in Lake Wales, Florida. It is located at 325 South Scenic Highway. On August 31, 1990, it was added to the U.S. National Register of Historic Places.

The Lake Wales Museum and Cultural Center, also known as The Depot, is a local history museum located in the historic depot. A model railroad layout is one of the exhibits on display.  The museum is operated with the support of the City of Lake Wales and the Historic Lake Wales Society.

References

External links
 Polk County listings at National Register of Historic Places
 Florida's Office of Cultural and Historical Programs
 Polk County listings
 The Depot: Lake Wales Museum and Cultural Center

 Lake Wales Museum and Cultural Center - official site

Railway stations on the National Register of Historic Places in Florida
Lake Wales Museum and Cultural Center
Buildings and structures in Lake Wales, Florida
Lake Wales
Museums in Polk County, Florida
National Register of Historic Places in Polk County, Florida
Railroad museums in Florida
History museums in Florida
Transportation buildings and structures in Polk County, Florida
1928 establishments in Florida
Railway stations in the United States opened in 1928